Naphat Jaruphatphakdee (born December 21, 1995) is a Thai professional footballer who plays as a centre-back. He currently plays for Rayong in the Thai League 2.

External links
 http://player.7mth.com/629826/index.shtml
 
 https://www.livesoccer888.com/thaipremierleague/2017/teams/Ubon-Umt-United/Players/Napatra-Jarupattarapakdi

References 

1995 births
Living people
Naphat Jaruphatphakdee
Naphat Jaruphatphakdee
Association football defenders
Naphat Jaruphatphakdee
Naphat Jaruphatphakdee
Naphat Jaruphatphakdee
Naphat Jaruphatphakdee
Naphat Jaruphatphakdee